Curly Strings is an Estonian folk band which was established in 2013.

Members
Eeva Talsi – fiddle, lead vocals
Taavet Niller – upright bass, vocals
Jaan Jaago – guitar, vocals
Villu Talsi – mandolin.

Discography

Albums
2015 "Üle ilma"
2017 "Hoolima"

Awards
Band has won several awards: 
Estonian Folk Music Awards
Album of the year 2015
Band of the year 2015
Best New Folk Artist 2017
Estonian Ethno Music Awards
Best New Folk Artist 2015.

References

External links
 

Estonian musical groups
Musical groups established in 2013
Estonian folk music groups